MAAA can mean:

 Middle Atlantic Athletic Association, college football conference in the 1930s
 Model Aeronautical Association of Australia, Australia's governing body for aeromodelling and model aircraft.
 Montreal Amateur Athletic Association, Canada's oldest athletic association.
 Montserrat Amateur Athletic Association, the governing body for the sport of athletics in Montserrat
 Museo de Arte Acarigua-Araure, an art gallery in Venezuela
 A Member of the American Academy of Actuaries.